Liam Cleere (born 1935) is an Irish retired hurler. At club level he played with Dicksboro and Bennettsbridge and was an All-Ireland Championship winner with the Kilkenny senior hurling team.

Honours

Bennettsbridge
Kilkenny Senior Hurling Championship (7): 1953, 1955, 1956, 1959, 1960, 1962, 1964

Kilkenny
All-Ireland Senior Hurling Championship (1): 1957
Leinster Senior Hurling Championship (3): 1957, 1958, 1959

References

1935 births
Living people
Dicksboro hurlers
Bennettsbridge hurlers
Kilkenny inter-county hurlers
All-Ireland Senior Hurling Championship winners
Hurling goalkeepers